This article is an incomplete list of sporting events relevant to South Africa in 1959

Golf
 Sewsunker "Papwa" Sewgolum, wins the Dutch Open for the first time
 Gary Player wins The Open Championship

See also
Timeline of South African sport.

 
South Africa